Wang Wanpeng (born June 9, 1982 in Dalian, Liaoning) is a Chinese footballer who currently plays for Yinchuan Helanshan in the China League Two.

Club career
After playing for various youth teams in Dalian and Shanghai, Wang would settle at Changchun where he would join  Changchun Yatai to start his career. Beginning his professional football career in 2001 he would become a squad regular and help them win the second tier league title in the 2003 league season. Unfortunately there was no promotion that year and he would have to wait until Changchun Yatai came second in the 2005 league season when they won promotion to the China Super League. He was diagnosed with heart disease in early 2004 and received surgery on 26 May. He lost his position after the surgery until 2007 when Gao Hongbo became the new manager of the team. He became a start player in the team that would go on to win the 2007 Chinese Super League title. On 19 March 2008, Wang torn the anterior cruciate ligament in his knee in a 2008 AFC Champions League match which Changchun tied with Adelaide United 0–0, ruling him out for the rest of the season. He returned to field in 2010 season, making 28 appearances as Changchun Yatai reached second place of the league and gained the entry into 2010 AFC Champions League. Wang became a substitute player in 2010 when team manager Shen Xiangfu decided to give chances to young players. He gained back his position in 2011 season, scoring 3 goals in 27 appearances. On 15 October 2011, he waved the finger towards fans in a league match against Beijing Guoan, which resulted in a ban of 6 matches and him being fined ¥30,000.
On 31 January 2015, Wang transferred to China League One side Dalian Aerbin.
On 14 June 2018, Dalian Yifang announced that he was loaned to Dalian Transcendence for the rest of the season.

On 31 January 2019, Wang transferred to League Two side Yinchuan Helanshan.

International career

Career statistics

Honours

Club
Changchun Yatai
Chinese Super League: 2007
Chinese Jia B League: 2003

Dalian Yifang
China League One: 2017

References

External links

 
Player stats at Sohu.com

1982 births
Living people
Chinese footballers
Footballers from Dalian
China international footballers
Changchun Yatai F.C. players
Dalian Professional F.C. players
Dalian Transcendence F.C. players
Chinese Super League players
China League One players
Association football defenders